New London Synagogue is a Masorti synagogue and congregation in St John's Wood, London, in the United Kingdom. It was founded in 1964 by followers of Rabbi Dr Louis Jacobs, following the "Jacobs Affair" in which Rabbi Jacobs was refused employment in the United Synagogue due to alleged heresy. It is the founding synagogue of the Masorti movement in the UK, which was established in 1985. Its congregation is made up of approximately 500 households.

The current rabbinic leaders are Rabbi Jeremy Gordon and Rabbi Natasha Mann.

History

Rabbi Louis Jacobs was an Orthodox pulpit rabbi at New West End Synagogue, when he was offered an appointment as Principal of Jews' College in 1961. However, the then Chief Rabbi of the United Kingdom, Israel Brodie, interdicted the appointment "because of his [Jacobs's] published views". This was a reference to We Have Reason to Believe, a book Jacobs had published in 1954 in which he questioned the doctrine of Torah min hashamayim. The British newspaper, The Jewish Chronicle, took up the issue and turned it into a cause célèbre which was reported in the national press, including The Times. It wasan event that threatened to become the biggest schism in Anglo-Jewish history.
The events in 1964 that came to be known as "the Jacobs Affair" dominated not just the Jewish media but the whole of Fleet Street and the newsrooms of both the BBC and ITN. When Jacobs wished to return to his pulpit at the New West End Synagogue, Brodie vetoed his appointment. A number of members then left the New West End Synagogue to found the New London Synagogue.

The building at 33 Abbey Road had formerly belonged to the United Synagogue as an Orthodox synagogue. However, the congregation had closed and the building was being sold off for demolition and redevelopment. Supporters of Louis Jacobs secretly set up a shell company and purchased it from the United Synagogue without disclosing they intended to establish a congregation with Louis Jacobs as its rabbi. This congregation, the New London Synagogue, became the "parent" of the Masorti movement in the United Kingdom, which now numbers several congregations.

While holding the position of rabbi at the New London Synagogue, Dr Jacobs was also for many years Lecturer in Talmud and Zohar at the Leo Baeck College, a rabbinical college preparing students to serve as Masorti, Reform and Liberal rabbis in the UK and Europe. Rabbi Jacobs served as Chairman of the Academic Committee for some years.

Architecture

H. H. Collin, the architect of the original building, also designed the Walworth Road Synagogue (1867), the Assembly Rooms in Yarmouth, Norfolk (1867), and the City Liberal Club, London (1875). New London Synagogue makes use of the structural cast-iron ‘railway station’ style, in the supporting columns, spandrels to the arches and gallery fronts; original pendant light fittings and a deep coved cornice.

The décor was redesigned in beige and brown by Misha Black, who also retained the classical timber Ark, now misleadingly painted white like stone, under a semi-circular archway. In the courtyard is a bronze Holocaust memorial by Naomi Black.

The building is listed Grade II by Historic England.

Ritual and practices

Services at New London Synagogue follow the traditional Koren Sacks siddur. Weekly egalitarian services were first introduced in 2005. Men and women sit together during services (within a tripartite seating structure), and also play equal parts in leading them. Male worshippers are required to wear a kippah; females can wear one if they wish to do so.

Rabbi Jeremy Gordon has been a strong proponent of LGBTQ inclusion, and New London Synagogue offers same-sex couples marriages. Rabbi Natasha Mann, hired as a co-rabbi in 2019, is the first openly queer rabbi in a traditional Jewish denomination in Europe. Mann originally converted to Judaism through New London's conversion programme. She was ordained at the Ziegler School of Rabbinic Studies, which is affiliated to Conservative Judaism.

Services have a strong musical element, with "traditional choral classics by Lewandowski, Sulzer, Alman and Naumberg with more modern compositions by Shlomo Carlebach, Meir Finkelstein, Debbie Friedman and others as well as compositions created by our member, the composer Julian Dawes, and our current Chazan".

In response to the COVID-19 pandemic, New London Synagogue began to provide a "set and forget" livestream of services, including High Holy Days.

Leadership

Rabbinic:

 Rabbi Louis Jacobs –  1964–2000
 Rabbi Chaim Weiner – 2000–2005
 Rabbi Reuven Hammer (interim) – 2005–2007
 Rabbi Jeremy Gordon – 2008–
 Rabbi Natasha Mann – 2019–

Chazzan:

 Cantor George Rothschild – 1964–1969
 Reverend Stanley Brickman – 1969–1971
 Cantor George Rothschild – 1971–1999
 Chazzan Stephen Cotsen – 1999–2012
 Chazzan Jason Green – 2013–2018
 Chazzan Stephen Cotsen – 2018–2022
 Co-Cantorial Leads David Djemal & Yoav Oved - 2022-

Membership data
1977 – 514 male (or household) members and 136 female members

1983 – 508 male (or household) members and 142 female members

1990 – 714 members (comprising 410 households, 115 individual male and 189 individual female members)

1996 – 604 members (comprising 358 households, 80 individual male and 166 individual female members)

2010 & 2016 – listed as having 500 to 749 members (by household)

Notable members

 Brian Epstein

See also

 List of Jewish communities in the United Kingdom
 List of former synagogues in the United Kingdom

Further reading 
 Freedman, Harry. Reason to Believe: The Controversial Life of Louis Jacobs Bloomsbury Continuum: London (2020) 
 The Synagogues of London by P. Lindsay, P., 1993 (Vallentine Mitchell, London)  p. 101.
 Four Rabbinic Positions in Anglo-Jewry – The New London Synagogue, Louis Jacobs (Jewish Year Book 2000) p. 80.

References

External links

 Official website
 New London Synagogue, JCR-UK
 Masorti UK

1880 establishments in England
Grade II listed places of worship in the City of Westminster
Grade II listed religious buildings and structures
Masorti synagogues in the United Kingdom
Religion in the City of Westminster
Synagogues in London